MOBTV (MediaCorp Online Broadband Television) was Singapore's first subscription-based video on demand service. Launched in August 2008, MOBTV provides viewers with access to various TV programmes via immediate digital streaming or download from an Internet connection.

From 30 March 2010, MOBTV merged with xinmsn.com as a free video on demand service, together with Podcast.sg and xin.sg. On 7 January 2014, MOBTV Select was discontinued on Mio TV, officially ending the MOBTV service.

Before migration
Subscribers could access MediaCorp TV programmes spanning a wide range of genres such as drama, variety, comedy, special, current affairs, documentaries and movies. A 14-day online review was also available for the benefit of viewers who have missed an episode or wish to watch a
particular programme again.

MOBTV was available on the Internet at www.mobtv.sg and as MOBTV Select on the SingTel mio TV service within Singapore. Subscribers outside of Singapore could only access the MediaCorp owned content.

Packages
MOBTV offered two types of subscription packages:

MediaCorp Channels Package (Singapore and International access)
This package included selective content from Channel 5, Channel 8, Channel U, Channel NewsAsia, Suria, okto and Vasantham. The subscription periods were 1 month or 3 months.

Asian Channels Package (Singapore access)
This package included selective contents from the Asian drama, Asian documentary, Asian movies, and MediaCorp telemovies.  This package also included movies and drama serials that are co-produced by MediaCorp and its external partners.

Discontinued
Animetrix (Singapore access)
This package allowed subscribers to watch popular titles like D.Gray-man, Neo Angelique Abyss, Zero No Tsukaima 3, Tokyo Majin, Yamato Nadeshinko Shichi and Seto No Hanayome.

In August 2008, MOBTV put online anime titles online in a belt called "AnimeTrix". The service offered on Internet SVOD anime episodes for streaming and download within the same week as the Japanese telecast.

Free video on demand
The Free VOD channels provide video streaming service and most of the free videos will be made available online on the next working day after its telecast on television. Each episode will be available online according to the license period.

This service is only available in Singapore and users must have a valid MOBTV account and a Singapore NRIC to access content.

References

2008 establishments in Singapore
2014 disestablishments in Singapore
Mass media in Singapore
Mediacorp